Operation Toan Thang IV ("Complete Victory") was a U.S. Army and Army of the Republic of Vietnam (ARVN) operation conducted between 1 November 1969 and 1 May 1970 in the Vietnam War. The operation was designed to keep pressure on Vietcong (VC) and People's Army of Vietnam (PAVN) forces in III Corps.

Background
The operation was a continuation of Operation Toan Thang III in the same operational area and with largely the same forces.

Operation

November
On 19 November a unit of the 3rd Brigade, 9th Infantry Division operating 21 km northwest of Tân An found a munitions cache containing 72 RPG-2 grenades, 106 hand grenades and 5,000 rounds of small arms ammunition. On 21 November a unit of the 1st Cavalry Division (Airmobile) operating near Phước Bình District found a weapons cache containing 39 rifles and four machine guns. On 29 November helicopters from the 2nd Brigade, 1st Cavalry Division and tactical airstrikes kill 69 PAVN/VC.

December

The enemy withdrew after five minutes, leaving seven dead; U.S. losses were two killed. The enemy withdrew at 19:00, leaving 17 dead; U.S. losses were four killed, including Second Lieutenant Robert Ronald Leisy, who shielded a fellow soldier from the blast of a Rocket-propelled grenade (RPG), an action for which he was posthumously awarded the Medal of Honor. The enemy withdrew, leaving nine dead and six AK-47s.

On 3 December in the early morning there were attacks by fire on Dầu Tiếng Base Camp, Tây Ninh Combat Base and Quần Lợi Base Camp causing minimal damage.

On 4 December in the early morning, there were attacks by fire on Tây Ninh Combat Base and Sông Bé Base Camp causing minimal damage, at Sông Bé helicopter gunships of the 2nd Brigade, 1st Cavalry Division, attacked the firing positions causing two secondary explosions. On 5 December, in the early morning, an attack by fire hit Tây Ninh Combat Base, causing minimal damage.

On 6 December, in the early morning, Quần Lợi Base Camp was attacked by fire causing minimal damage. The enemy withdrew after 20 minutes, leaving 45 dead and 12 individual weapons, one 60 mm mortar and a 12.7mm machine gun.

The enemy withdrew at 15:40, leaving 19 dead and one .30 cal machine gun. At 17:15 1/9th Cavalry helicopters received 12.7mm fire from the same area and attacked the position, killing 13 PAVN/VC.

On 8 December in the early morning attacks by fire were made on most base camps in the operational area causing minimal damage. At 13:00 a unit of the armored cavalry squadron of the 25th Infantry Division was attacked 8 miles northeast of Trảng Bàng District, the unit returned fire supported by artillery, helicopter gunships and airstrikes. The enemy withdrew at 18:00, leaving 13 dead.

A sweep of the area at dawn found six PAVN/VC dead, three RPG launchers, two AK-47s and a radio.

The unit was supported by artillery and helicopter gunships and the fighting continued until 18:05 when the enemy withdrew, leaving 20 dead and one captured and five individual weapons; U.S. losses were on killed. At 15:05 a unit of the 3rd Brigade, 1st Infantry Division operating 10 miles west of Chơn Thành District engaged an enemy force. The enemy withdrew at 17:45, leaving eight dead and three individual weapons. The unit returned fire supported by artillery and helicopter gunships and the enemy withdrew at 20:30, leaving five dead and one individual and one crew-served weapon; U.S. losses were one killed. At 19:10 a unit of the 3rd Brigade patrolling 4 miles north of Hiệp Hòa was attacked, the unit returned fire and the enemy withdrew after two hours; U.S. losses were one killed. At 20:00 another Brigade patrol was attacked in the same area, the unit returned fire supported by artillery and helicopter gunships and the enemy withdrew after 45 minutes; U.S. losses were four killed.

The enemy withdrew at 12:50, leaving ten dead. The unit was supported by artillery, helicopter gunships and airstrikes and reinforced by a Regional Force (RF) unit. The enemy withdrew at 16:45, leaving 19 dead and seven individual and one crew-served weapon; U.S. losses were one killed. At 14:10 a unit of the 3rd Brigade, 1st Cavalry Division, found a weapons cache 9 miles northwest of Sông Bé containing 50 submachineguns, three AK-47s, five SKS, one RPG-2 launcher, 86,000 rounds of small arms ammunition, 269 RPG-2 grenades and 67 RPG-7 grenades. At 19:00 a Ranger unit of the 3rd Brigade, 9th Infantry Division, engaged six PAVN/VC 6 miles northwest of Tân An, killing five.

The enemy withdrew at 09:30, leaving 51 dead and 15 individual and seven crew-served weapons; U.S. losses were four killed. The aerorifle platoon was landed in the area and found 11 PAVN/VC dead and captured three.

On 17 December at 00:45, a 122 mm rocket hit Saigon destroying a house.

On 18 December at 00:30, a rocket attack on Tây Ninh Combat Base killed a Kit Carson Scout. At 14:50 a mechanized infantry unit from the 1st Brigade, 25th Infantry Division, was attacked 9 miles northeast of Go Dau Ha. The unit returned fire supported by artillery, helicopter gunships and airstrikes. The enemy withdrew at 17:30, leaving 14 dead; U.S. losses were two killed. On 19 December at 02:30, five 122 mm rockets hit Tan Son Nhut Air Base causing minimal damage.

Nine PAVN/VC dead were seen among 15 destroyed bunkers in the strike area. The unit was supported by artillery and an AC-119 gunship, the enemy withdrew at 21:30, leaving seven dead and four individual weapons. The enemy withdrew after two hours, leaving five dead.

The enemy withdrew at 23:00, leaving ten dead.

Operations were suspended for a Christmas ceasefire from 18:00 on 24 December to 18:00 on 25 December.

At 12:45 ground units of the Regiment and RF forces swept the area and engaged the PAVN supported by artillery, helicopter gunships and airstrikes. The PAVN withdrew at 13:10, leaving 79 dead among 40 destroyed bunkers; U.S. losses were one killed. The PAVN were identified as coming from the 7th Division.

The unit returned fire and was supported by artillery, helicopter gunships, airstrikes and AC-119 fire. The enemy withdrew after ten minutes, leaving three dead and two AK-47s; U.S. losses were seven killed. The enemy withdrew after two hours, leaving three dead. At 17:20, 600 m to the northeast, another helicopter received fire and engaged the firing position and directed artillery and airstrikes onto the location following this 41 PAVN/VC dead were seen in the strike area.

The OH-6 was hit and forced to land nearby and the aerorifle position was landed to protect the crew. The enemy withdrew at 18:00, leaving 29 dead among 19 destroyed bunkers. At 16:15 an OH-6 from the 1/9th Cavalry attacked six PAVN/VC 4 miles north-northeast of Phước Bình and a second OH-6 joined the skirmish and was shot down. The aerorifle platoon was landed at the crash site and engaged the enemy supported by artillery and airstrikes. The enemy withdrew at 17:15, leaving 24 dead and three 12.7mm machine guns; U.S. losses were one killed. At 18:30 another unit of the Brigade engaged five PAVN/VC 5 miles northeast of Tân An, killing all five.

At 14:45 troops from the 1/9th Cavalry operating 6 miles northeast of Bến Cát captured two PAVN/VC and found one dead. A New Year ceasefire began at 18:00 on 31 December and continued until 18:00 on 1 January. At 21:45 a U.S. Navy PBR engaged PAVN/VC crossing the Saigon River 6 miles southwest of Bến Cát, killing one.

Cumulative operational results to the end of December were 5,493 PAVN/VC killed, 822 suspects detained and 1,839 individual and 246 crew-served weapons captured. U.S. losses were 206 killed.

January
At 06:00 a unit of the 3rd Brigade, 25th Infantry Division, in a night defensive position 3 miles southwest of Go Dau Ha killed a PAVN/VC soldier approaching their perimeter. At 16:45 a unit of the 3rd Brigade, 1st Cavalry Division, engaged three PAVN/VC approaching their position 6 miles southeast of Lộc Ninh, killing two and capturing two individual weapons. At 17:30 a unit of the 2nd Brigade, 25th Infantry Division, was attacked with grenades 3 miles east of Trảng Bàng, the unit returned fire and captured one PAVN/VC and one individual weapon. At 19:50 a unit of the 1st Brigade, 25th Infantry Division, supported by artillery and helicopter gunships engaged 50–70 PAVN/VC 6 miles northwest of Go Dau Ha. The enemy withdrew at 00:15 on 2 January, leaving 16 dead.

The enemy withdrew at 00:10 on 4 January, leaving five dead and four individual weapons.

The enemy withdrew at 14:50; U.S. losses were one killed. At 15:50 600 m to the north another Brigade unit engaged an enemy force until the enemy withdrew after 40 minutes. At 20:00 a Ranger unit of the 3rd Brigade, 9th Infantry Division, supported by artillery and helicopter gunships engaged ten PAVN/VC 6 miles south of Bến Lức, killing nine. A UH-1 was shot down 7 miles south-southeast of Katum.

Contact was lost at 10:30, but air cavalry forces pursued and reestablished contact which continued until the enemy withdrew at 16:15, leaving 87 dead and 29 individual and seven crew-served weapons; U.S. losses were one killed.

The enemy withdrew at 18:30, leaving 62 dead and two individual weapons; U.S. losses were two killed, including Specialist Four Danny J. Petersen who was posthumously awarded the Medal of Honor for providing covering fire so other members of his unit could withdraw. A UH-1 was shot down in Tây Ninh. On 9 January at 10:00, a unit of the 1st Brigade, 25th Infantry Division, was attacked 7 miles north-northeast of Tây Ninh, the unit returned fire supported by artillery, helicopter gunships and airstrikes. The enemy withdrew at 18:00, leaving 47 dead. At 16:25 a helicopter from the 1st Aviation Brigade received fire 1 mile northeast of Trảng Bàng and returned fire, killing five PAVN/VC.

The unit returned fire and was supported by artillery, helicopter gunships and airstrikes which forced the enemy to withdraw after 15 minutes, leaving 41 dead and one individual and one crew-served weapon. At 17:40 800 m to the south the same units were attacked by the enemy, the unit returned fire and the enemy withdrew after 35 minutes, leaving 21 dead and one crew-served weapon.

The unit returned fire and the enemy withdrew after 10 minutes, leaving 15 dead and two machine guns. Rangers and infantry from the 3rd Brigade, 9th Infantry Division, were landed in the area and engaged the enemy forces. At 12:45 an OH-6 was shot down in the area. The enemy withdrew at 13:25, leaving 26 dead and one individual weapon; U.S. losses were one killed.

The units returned fire supported by artillery and helicopter gunships. The enemy withdrew at 03:00, leaving 19 dead and six AK-47s, three RPG-2 launchers and one RPG-7 launcher; U.S. losses were one killed.

At 21:50 a unit of the 3rd Brigade, 25th Infantry Division, supported by artillery and helicopter gunships engaged an enemy force 8 miles north of Tân An, the enemy withdrew after 45 minutes, leaving seven dead.

At 20:00 a unit of the 2nd Brigade, 25th Infantry Division, engaged ten PAVN/VC 4 miles north of Củ Chi, killing six and capturing one individual and one crew-served weapons. At 17:10 the aerorifle platoon was landed in the area and they found 12 dead. An AH-1 was shot down 6 miles southeast of Phước Bình.

A unit of the 11th ACR moved to the area and engaged an enemy force at 15:30 supported by artillery, helicopter gunships and airstrikes. The enemy withdrew at 16:45, leaving 27 dead. Also at 12:30 helicopter gunships from the 1/9th Cavalry received fire in Phước Long Province and engaged the firing position supported by artillery, killing 17 PAVN/VC. The enemy withdrew after 20 minutes; U.S. losses were one killed.

The unit was reinforced by other Regiment units and a unit from the 2nd Brigade, 1st Cavalry Division. The enemy withdrew at 16:00, leaving 35 dead and seven AK-47s, one 12.7mm machine gun, four RPG launchers, a 57 mm recoilless rifle and a 60 mm mortar. The enemy withdrew, leaving eight dead and three 12.7mm machine guns among five destroyed bunkers. At 18:00 helicopter gunships from the 1/9th Cavalry received fire 10 miles south of Katum, they returned fire and directed artillery and airstrikes onto the location and 15 dead and one destroyed crew-served weapon were seen in the strike area.

The enemy withdrew at 17:30, leaving eight dead and one AK-47; U.S. losses were one killed. The enemy withdrew after 20 minutes; U.S. losses were one killed and one Kit Carson Scout killed.

At 12:30 a unit of the 2nd Brigade, 1st Cavalry Division, engaged an enemy platoon 9 miles east of Phước Bình, the enemy withdrew after 45 minutes, leaving ten dead; U.S. losses were two killed.

At 10:45 20 107/122 mm rockets hit Tây Ninh Combat Base, killing one Vietnamese civilian. The enemy withdrew after an hour, leaving seven dead and one AK-47.

The unit returned fire supported by helicopter gunships and an AC-119. The enemy withdrew after 45 minutes, leaving five dead; U.S. losses were two killed.

Cumulative operational results to the end of January were 6,734 PAVN/VC killed and 2,145 individual and 277 crew-served weapons captured. U.S. losses were 261 killed.

February
The unit returned fire supported by artillery, helicopter gunships and an AC-119. The enemy withdrew at 21:30, leaving three dead; U.S. losses were two killed, including First lieutenant Russell A. Steindam who would be posthumously awarded the Medal of Honor for smothering a hand grenade with his body. A UH-1 was shot down 6 miles southwest of Lai Khê killing one U.S. and six ARVN.

The enemy withdrew after five minutes, but at 03:45 helicopter gunships searching the area engaged an enemy force, killing 13; U.S. losses were one killed. The battle continued until 17:00 when the enemy withdrew, leaving 19 dead and 11 individual weapons. The enemy withdrew at 18:30, leaving 33 dead among 40 destroyed bunkers. Air cavalry troops were landed in the area and the enemy withdrew at 20:15, leaving 23 dead. The unit returned fire supported by artillery and helicopter gunships and the enemy withdrew after one hour, but as unit troops swept the perimeter they were engaged by an enemy company, the fighting continued until 12:15 when the enemy withdrew, leaving 44 dead and 28 individual weapons, two crew-served weapons and 114 RPG rounds; U.S. losses were four killed.

On 5 February at 18:00, Allied forces began a 24-hour Tết ceasefire. At 18:45 another light observation helicopter from the 1/9th Cavalry received fire 11 miles northwest of Katum and returned fire, killing three PAVN/VC. At 20:00 a unit of the 11th ACR in a night defensive position 4 miles northwest of Katum engaged enemy forces approaching their position, killing one. At 21:40 a unit from the 3rd Brigade, 9th Infantry Division, received fire 6 miles northeast of Tân An, the unit returned fire and the enemy withdrew, leaving four PAVN/VC dead and three individual weapons. At 21:50 a unit from the 3rd Brigade, 9th Infantry Division, received fire 7 miles north-northeast of Tân An and returned fire, killing one PAVN/VC.

The enemy withdrew at 02;10, leaving eight dead and two individual weapons; U.S. losses were two killed.

The units returned fire supported by artillery and helicopter gunships and the enemy withdrew at 17:50, leaving 14 dead and two individual weapons and one light machine gun. The enemy withdrew at 16:20, leaving 14 dead and two captured and six individual and one crew-served weapons.

Specialist Four John Baca would be awarded the Medal of Honor for his actions in smothering an enemy hand grenade with his body. On 11 February at 14:40, helicopter gunships from the 1/9th Cavalry attacked 20 PAVN/VC 9 miles west of Lộc Ninh, killing nine.

The unit returned fire supported by artillery and helicopter gunships. The contact was lost at 15:15 but reestablished at 16:15 and the battle continued until 18:40 when the enemy withdrew, leaving 44 dead. U.S. losses were ten killed and one tank and one armored reconnaissance vehicle destroyed. The enemy withdrew after 30 minutes, leaving four dead and one individual weapon; U.S. losses were one killed. An OH-6 was shot down 7 miles south of Bearcat, killing one crewman.

At 12:10 a helicopter from the 11th ACR received fire 6 miles northwest of Lộc Ninh and returned fire and called in artillery and airstrikes on the firing position; seven PAVN/VC dead were seen in the strike area. A unit of the 2nd Brigade, 1st Cavalry Division, approaching the crash site was engaged by an enemy force and fought them until they withdrew at 16:00, leaving 14 dead. An OH-6 was shot down 9 miles south-southwest of Lai Khê.

The enemy withdrew at 20:50; U.S. losses were two killed.

Air cavalry troops were landed in the area and found ten PAVN/VC dead. On 22 February at 03:05, a unit of the 3rd Brigade, 9th Infantry Division, engaged an enemy force 7 miles north-northeast of Tân An, killing five PAVN/VC. A UH-1 was shot down 7 miles north-northeast of Lộc Ninh.

The unit was supported by artillery and helicopter gunships and the enemy withdrew at 04:30, leaving two dead and one RPG launcher and various munitions. The unit was supported by artillery and helicopter gunships and the enemy withdrew after 20 minutes, leaving eight dead and seven individual weapons. U.S. losses were one killed.

On 28 February at midnight ten 122 mm rockets hit Bien Hoa Air Base, killing one Vietnamese civilian and destroying two houses. The enemy withdrew at 16:15, leaving eight dead and 13 individual weapons and one light machine gun; U.S. losses were one killed.

Cumulative operational results to the end of February were 10,832 PAVN/VC killed and 4,148 individual and 418 crew-served weapons captured. U.S. losses were 458 killed.

March
The enemy withdrew at 14:05; U.S. losses were two killed. The unit returned fire supported by artillery and helicopter gunships and the enemy withdrew at 04:25; U.S. losses were one killed.

A UH-1 was shot down 6 miles northeast of Bearcat. The unit returned fire supported by artillery and helicopter gunships and the enemy withdrew after five minutes, leaving 37 dead and 12 individual weapons; U.S. losses were one killed. On 5 March at 00:30 a unit of the 11th ACR in a night defensive position 30 miles northeast of Tây Ninh received fire and returned fire supported by artillery and helicopter gunships. The enemy withdrew after an hour, leaving six dead; U.S. losses were one killed. At 11:40 a unit of the 1st Brigade, 1st Cavalry Division, engaged an enemy force 30 miles north of Tây Ninh, the enemy withdrew immediately and a search of the area found a weapons cache containing 109 individual and three crew-served weapons. The unit was supported by artillery, helicopter gunships and airstrikes and the enemy withdrew at 17:00, leaving 17 dead.

At 17:35 the 1/9th Cavalry engaged an enemy force 9 miles northeast of Lộc Ninh, the enemy withdrew after 40 minutes, leaving eight dead; U.S. losses were one killed. A UH-1 was shot down 9 miles southeast of Bến Tre. The unit returned fire supported by artillery and the enemy withdrew, leaving 13 dead and four individual and three crew-served weapons.

Contact was lost at 14:45 then reestablished and then lost at 19:00. Four PAVN/VC were killed and three U.S. killed. The enemy withdrew after 25 minutes, leaving 29 dead; U.S. losses were three killed. The unit returned fire and artillery and helicopter gunships were directed onto the firing positions. A sweep of the area at dawn found ten PAVN/VC dead and four destroyed bunkers. A CH-47 Chinook crashed shortly after takeoff from Quần Lợi Base Camp, killing five on board.

The unit was supported by artillery, helicopter gunships and airstrikes and the enemy withdrew at midday, leaving 54 dead and five captured and 19 individual and 10 crew-served weapons; U.S. losses were four killed.

The enemy withdrew after 35 minutes, leaving eight dead and one individual weapon. The units returned fire supported by artillery and helicopter gunships. The enemy withdrew at 10:30, leaving 29 dead and eight individual weapons; U.S. losses were four killed. At 17:15 a unit of the 3rd Brigade, 1st Cavalry Division, received fire 9 miles northwest of Sông Bé, the unit returned fire and the enemy withdrew, leaving six dead and two individual weapons; U.S. losses were three killed. A UH-1 crashed  from Bà Rịa, killing all ten on board.

The unit returned fire supported by artillery and helicopter gunships. The enemy withdrew, leaving 12 dead; U.S. losses were one killed. As the unit was searching the battle area an AH-1 experienced a weapons system malfunction and fired several 2.75in rockets into the unit, killing three.

The enemy withdrew at 19:00; U.S. losses were one killed. The enemy withdrew at 18:45, leaving 25 dead; U.S. losses were two killed. At 15:40  to the southeast an infantry unit from the 1st Brigade received fire and returned fire supported by artillery, helicopter gunships and airstrikes which forced the enemy to withdraw at 18:00.

The enemy withdrew after 15 minutes, leaving five dead; U.S. losses were one killed.

A unit of the 1st Brigade reinforced the contact and artillery and helicopter gunships provided support. The enemy withdrew at 13:30, leaving 39 dead and 13 AK-47s and one RPG-2 launcher. At 18:15 a helicopter gunship from the 1/9th Cavalry received fire 7 miles northeast of Phước Bình and returned fire, killing six PAVN/VC.

The enemy withdrew after 50 minutes, leaving nine dead and two individual weapons. The unit was supported by artillery and helicopter gunships and the enemy withdrew after an hour, leaving four dead and one individual weapon; U.S. losses were one killed.

At 11:00 the same unit engaged another enemy force  to the south-southwest, killing another five. The enemy withdrew at 18:10, leaving 20 dead.

Another brigade unit and a unit from the 11th ACR reinforced and the enemy withdrew at 19:10, leaving 88 dead; U.S. losses were two killed. The enemy withdrew after 25 minutes, leaving 11 dead and five individual and two crew-served weapons. The enemy withdrew at 17:30, leaving three dead; U.S. losses were one killed.

The units returned fire supported by artillery, helicopter gunships and an AC-119. The enemy withdrew at 06:00, leaving 74 dead and three captured and 12 AK-47s; U.S. losses were 13 killed.

On 31 March at 01:35 Tây Ninh Combat Base was attacked by fire. The defenders returned fire supported by artillery and helicopter gunships. The enemy withdrew at 05:15, leaving six dead and two captured and three AK-47s, four RPG-7 launchers and a pistol. The enemy withdrew after 35 minutes, leaving two dead; U.S. losses were two killed. The enemy withdrew at 15:30, leaving 30 dead and 16 captured and five individual and two crew-served weapons.

Cumulative operational results to the end of March were 13,614 PAVN/VC killed and 5,298 individual and 529 crew-served weapons captured. U.S. losses were 628 killed.

April
On 1 April during the early morning most Allied bases in the operational area received attacks by fire causing minimal damage. The units fought back supported by artillery and helicopter gunships and was then reinforced by a unit from the 11th ACR. The enemy withdrew at 04:30, leaving 62 dead and 28 individual weapons; U.S. losses were 24 killed. Specialist Four Peter C. Lemon would be awarded the Medal of Honor for his actions during the battle. The unit was supported by artillery and helicopter gunships and reinforced by another unit from the Regiment. The enemy withdrew after three hours, leaving 12 dead and one captured and nine individual and two crew-served weapons; U.S. losses were one killed. The enemy withdrew at 14:30, leaving seven dead and two individual and one crew-served weapons; U.S. losses were four killed, including 199th LIB commander, Brigadier General William R. Bond.

Thirty minutes later a unit of the 3rd Brigade moved into the area and engaged an enemy force supported by helicopter gunships and airstrikes, fighting continued until the enemy withdrew at 18:40, leaving 20 dead; U.S. losses were eight killed. At 12:25 a mechanized infantry unit of the 25th Infantry Division engaged an enemy force 7 miles northeast of Tây Ninh, the enemy withdrew after 25 minutes, leaving six dead and one individual and one crew-served weapons; U.S. losses were two killed.

An OH-6 was shot down 14 miles northwest of Lộc Ninh.

The enemy withdrew at 13:20 but contact was reestablished at 16:10 and the enemy finally withdrew at 16:40, leaving 26 dead and seven individual and four crew-served weapons; U.S. losses were two killed.

The enemy withdrew at 16:00, leaving 31 dead and one individual weapon, an RPG-2 launcher and a 60 mm mortar. At 23:30 four 122 mm rockets hit central Saigon, killing two civilians.

On 15 April at 02:30 a unit of the 11th ACR at a firebase 17 miles northwest of Tây Ninh was attacked by fire, and the unit returned fire supported by helicopter gunships. The enemy withdrew and a search of the area at dawn found 18 PAVN/VC dead, 11 individual and three crew-served weapons and two 60 mm mortars. The unit returned fire supported by artillery, helicopter gunships and airstrikes, and the enemy withdrew at midnight. A search of the area found 55 PAVN/VC dead and three captured and 17 individual and seven crew-served weapons; U.S. losses were seven killed.

On 16 April at 02:20 four 122 mm rockets hit central Saigon, causing minor damage.

An OH-6 was shot down 6 miles south of Bến Cát. On 22 April at 11:20 a unit of the 2nd Brigade, 1st Cavalry Division, engaged an enemy force 18 miles east-northeast of Phước Bình, the enemy withdrew after 15 minutes, leaving three dead; U.S. losses were one killed. At 14:20 an armored unit of the 1st Brigade, 25th Infantry Division, operating 18 miles southeast of Biên Hòa engaged an enemy force, killing five and capturing five individual weapons.

At 23:15 a unit of the 1st brigade, 25th Infantry Division at Firebase Pine Ridge received mortar fire followed by a sapper attack. The defenders were supported by artillery, helicopter gunships and AC-47 and AC-119 gunships. The enemy withdrew after 30 minutes, leaving one dead and one individual weapon and 15 satchel charges; U.S. losses were four killed.

At 14:35 a unit of the 11th ACR engaged an enemy unit 30 miles north-northwest of Tây Ninh, the enemy withdrew after 40 minutes, leaving three dead and three individual weapons. At 18:10 helicopter gunships from the 1/9th Cavalry attacked 18 PAVN/VC 30 miles north-northwest of Tây Ninh and called in airstrikes on the area, 16 PAVN/VC and seven destroyed bunkers were seen in the strike area. An OH-6 was shot down 26 miles northeast of Tây Ninh.

The enemy withdrew after one hour, leaving one dead and one crew-served weapon; U.S. losses were one killed. At 17:20 a unit of the 199th LIB engaged an enemy force 19 miles southeast of Biên Hòa; the enemy withdrew after 10 minutes, leaving seven dead and one individual weapon.

Aftermath
The operation concluded on 1 May 1970. 14,479 PAVN/VC were killed and 5,406 individual and 586 crew-served weapons captured. U.S. losses were 685 killed. With the start of the Cambodian Campaign on 29 April, all units involved in the operation moved their focus to the PAVN/VC base areas along the Cambodian–South Vietnamese border.

References

1969 in Vietnam
1970 in Vietnam
Battles and operations of the Vietnam War in 1969
Battles and operations of the Vietnam War in 1970
Battles and operations of the Vietnam War
Battles involving the United States
Battles involving Vietnam
History of Bình Dương province
History of Bình Phước Province
History of Đồng Nai Province
History of Ho Chi Minh City
History of Long An Province
History of Tây Ninh Province